The Lézard Rouge (French for "Red Lizard") is a historic Tunisian train, once the property of the Bey of Tunis, but now used for tourists. It runs from Metlaoui to Redeyef and passes through the spectacular Selja Gorges, taking some 40 minutes for the journey. The railway was built for mining trains carrying phosphates.

References

See also
 "I treni di Tozeur"

Tourist attractions in Tunisia
Named passenger trains of Tunisia
Metre gauge railways in Tunisia